Gregg Steinhafel (born 1954) is an American business executive, and the former President, CEO and Chairman of the Board of Target Corporation.

Early life
Gregg Steinhafel was born in 1954 in Milwaukee, Wisconsin. His grandfather founded Steinhafels Furniture in Milwaukee, Wisconsin in 1934. He began working in the store when he was in grade school, performing odd jobs. He graduated from Carroll University in Waukesha, Wisconsin and the Kellogg School of Management at Northwestern University in Evanston, Illinois.

Career
In 1979, he was recruited as a merchandising trainee by Target, where he moved up the organization ranks. He became the Executive Vice President of Merchandising in July 1994 and became Chief Executive Officer on May 1, 2008. On May 2, 2014, Target executives issued a "him or us" ultimatum that forced Steinhafel to resign from his position as CEO on May 5, 2014 as a result of the data breach that affected 70 million to 110 million consumers. His tenure as CEO of Target also included a disastrous expansion of Target into Canada in which the company lost $2 billion in 2 years. On top of the cost burden from buying out 220 leases of discount retailer chain Zellers, the expansion was plagued by flawed execution, including inventory and restocking problems, poor locations and higher prices than Canadian shoppers expected. Gregg Steinhafel received a severance package of $61 million and agreed to "remain employed by Target in an advisory capacity to assist with the transition through no later than August 23, 2014."

Steinhafel is also Director, Member of Nominating and Governance Committee and Member of Compensation & Human Resources Committee for The Toro Company and Vice Chairman of the Retail Industry Leaders Association.

References

1954 births
Date of birth missing (living people)
Living people
Kellogg School of Management alumni
American retail chief executives
Target Corporation people
Businesspeople from Milwaukee
Carroll University alumni
American people of German descent
American chairpersons of corporations